The 1963 Cork Intermediate Hurling Championship was the 54th staging of the Cork Intermediate Hurling Championship since its establishment by the Cork County Board in 1909.

Cobh won the championship following a 2–10 to 3–05 defeat of Castletownroche in the final. This was their third championship title overall and their first title since 1927.

References

Cork Intermediate Hurling Championship
Cork Intermediate Hurling Championship